Ikot Akpa Nkuk is a town as well as the Local Government HQuarters of Ukanafun in Akwa Ibom State, Nigeria.
It is also one among the  major towns of the Ukanafun South District/Clan.

References 

Populated places in Akwa Ibom State